Jerry Lindsey Martin (born May 11, 1949) is an American former Professional baseball outfielder. On November 17, Martin and Kansas City Royals teammates Willie Aikens and Willie Wilson each received three-month prison terms on misdemeanor attempted cocaine possession charges. They became the first active major leaguers to serve jail time.

Furman University Paladins basketball
Martin was born in Columbia, South Carolina, and attended Olympia High School there. He then attended Furman University in Greenville. He starred in basketball, and was named the All-Southern Conference Tournament Most Valuable Player in  after leading the Furman Paladins to their first conference championship.

Philadelphia Phillies
Despite his prowess in basketball, he decided to follow his father, Barney Martin, who pitched in the majors with the Cincinnati Reds, as well as his younger brother, Michael, a left handed pitcher selected fifth overall in the 1970 Major League Baseball draft by the Philadelphia Phillies. A year later, Jerry signed with the club as an amateur free agent. Despite having spent three seasons together in the same organization, the brothers were never teammates.

Making his major league debut as a late inning defensive replacement for Greg Luzinski on September 7, Martin did not log an at-bat. When given his first major league at bat two days later, he drove in Luzinski with the first run of the Phillies' 2-0 victory over the St. Louis Cardinals.

After splitting the  season between the Phillies and the triple A Toledo Mud Hens, Martin spent the entire  season serving as a late inning defensive replacement for Luzinski. He appeared in 130 games, but logged only 129 at-bats. He made just one plate appearance in the 1976 National League Championship Series against the Cincinnati Reds. He reached first base on an error, and scored on Jay Johnstone's triple in the ninth inning of the third game.

Despite having been a promising prospect for the Phillies, Martin would never rise above fourth outfielder status over his next two seasons with the Phillies. He, Barry Foote, Ted Sizemore and minor leaguers Derek Botelho and Henry Mack went to the Cubs for Greg Gross, Dave Rader and Manny Trillo.

Chicago Cubs
Finally given the opportunity to start, Martin had a career year his first season in Chicago. Playing centerfield and batting sixth in the Cubs' line-up, Martin clubbed nineteen home runs, and drove in 73 runs while scoring 74. After a contract dispute, Martin asked to be traded, and was sent to the San Francisco Giants with Jesús Figueroa and a player to be named later for Phil Nastu and Joe Strain at the 1980 Winter meetings.

San Francisco Giants
Martin signed a five-year deal shortly after arriving in San Francisco, however, his tenure with the Giants ended up being shorter than expected. His numbers dipped in the strike shortened  season, as he hit just four home runs and drove in 25 while batting .241. After just one season with the Giants, Martin was dealt to the Kansas City Royals for pitchers Rich Gale and Bill Laskey.

Kansas City Royals
A new position came with his change of scenery, as Martin was shifted to right field with the Royals. He got off to a hot start in Kansas City, batting .304 with five home runs and 25 RBIs through May.

Toward the end of the 1983 season, Martin and several of his Royals teammates were questioned by U.S. Attorney Jim Marquez in connection with a federal cocaine probe. Following the season, he, Willie Aikens and Willie Wilson pleaded guilty to attempting to purchase cocaine, while former teammate Vida Blue pleaded guilty to possession of three grams of cocaine. On November 17, Martin, Aikens, Blue and Wilson were all sentenced to a year in prison, with nine months of it suspended, and ordered to surrender to a Fort Worth, Texas minimum security federal correctional institution on December 5 (Aikens was given until January 5 in order to complete a drug treatment program).

New York Mets
Martin was released early from prison on February 23, however, Baseball commissioner Bowie Kuhn subsequently suspended all four players for the entire  season. The suspensions were reduced after appeal, and the four were allowed to return to their teams on May 15. By then, Martin had signed with the New York Mets.

Martin joined the Mets on May 16 in San Francisco. Through 51 games with the Mets, Martin managed just a .154 batting average, three home runs and five RBIs, and was released on September 30.

A bid for a comeback in  found no takers, so he retired. Martin took a coaching job in the Phillies' minor league system shortly after his retirement. He spent the first six weeks of the  season as interim first base coach for the eventual World Champion Phillies while Davey Lopes was undergoing treatment for prostate cancer.

Tommy John called Martin "a strong defensive outfielder."

See also
List of second-generation Major League Baseball players

References

External links

Jerry Martin at Baseball Almanac
Jerry Martin at Pura Pelota (Venezuelan Professional Baseball League)

1949 births
Living people
Águilas del Zulia players
American people convicted of drug offenses
Baseball players from Columbia, South Carolina
Chicago Cubs players
Fort Myers Sun Sox players
Furman Paladins baseball players
Furman Paladins men's basketball players
Kansas City Royals players
Major League Baseball outfielders
Major League Baseball players suspended for drug offenses
Minor league baseball managers
Navegantes del Magallanes players
American expatriate baseball players in Venezuela
New York Mets players
Orlando Juice players
Philadelphia Phillies players
Pulaski Phillies players
Reading Phillies players
San Francisco Giants players
Spartanburg Phillies players
Tidewater Tides players
Toledo Mud Hens players
St. Petersburg Pelicans players
Spartanburg Methodist Pioneers baseball players